The Assistant Secretary of State for Administration is the head of the Bureau of Administration in the United States Department of State.  The Assistant Secretary of State for Administration reports to the Under Secretary of State for Management.

List of Assistant Secretaries of State for Administration, 1945—present

References

Profile from State Department Historian
Official website